Papua New Guinea competed at the 2011 Pacific Games in Nouméa, New Caledonia between August 27 and September 10, 2011. As of June 28, 2011 Papua New Guinea has listed 432 competitors.

Archery

Papua New Guinea has qualified 4 athletes.

Men
Nagato Suke
Ohe Suke
Paul Webb Thorn Speedy

Women
Fiona Speedy

Athletics

Papua New Guinea has qualified 42 athletes.

Men
Veherney Babob
Kupsy Bisamo
Mowen Boino -  110m Hurdles,  400m Hurdles,  4 × 400 m Relay
Porua Das
Andipas Georasi
Martin Gereo
Wala Gime -  4 × 400 m Relay
Ruwan Gunasinghe -  4 × 100 m Relay,  100m
David Jessem -  High Jump
Kevin Kapmatana -  800m
Skene Kiage -  3000m Steeplechase
Francis Kompaon -  100m Parasport Ambulant
Elias Larry -  100m Parasport Ambulant
Joe Matmat
Reginald Monagi
John Rivan -  4 × 400 m Relay,  400m
Issac Samson
Nelson Stone -  400m,  4 × 400 m Relay,  200m,  4 × 100 m Relay
Kupun Wisil -  4 × 100 m Relay
Reginald Worealevi -  4 × 100 m Relay
Sapolai Yai
Sapolai Yao -  3000m Steeplechase

Women
Jenny Albert
Dephanie Aito
Betty Burua -  400m Hurdles,  Triple Jump
Salome Dell -  800m,  1500m,  4 × 400 m Relay,  400m
Regina Edward
Gethrude Joe
Poro Michly Gahekave
Naomie Kerari
Donna Koniel -  4 × 400 m Relay,  800m,  400m Hurdles
Cecilia Kumalalamene -  800m
Sharon Kwarula -  100m Hurdles,  400m Hurdles,  4 × 100 m Relay,  4 × 400 m Relay
Nellie Leslie -  High Jump
Rose Peter
Helen Philemon -  4 × 100 m Relay,  Long Jump
Anna Pius
Eunice Steven
Tuna Tine
Venessa Waro -  4 × 100 m Relay,  200m
Rose Welepa -  Shot Put Parasport Seated
Toea Wisil -  100m,  200m,  400m,  4 × 100 m Relay,  4 × 400 m Relay

Basketball

Papua New Guinea has qualified a men's and women's team.  Each team can consist of a maximum of 12 athletes

Men
Apia Muri
Charles Parapa
Dia Muri
James Ipasi
Joe Elavo
Mika Loko
Peter Davani
Purari Muri
Richard Arava
Sibona Kala
Veuga Taviri
Wally Parapa

Women
Emily Koivi
Jennifer Maroroa
Jenny Magatu
Priscilla Maha Karo
Louisa Wallace
Nape Waka
Susan Paisoi

Bodybuilding

Papua New Guinea has qualified 7 athletes.

Men
Peter Daii
Iso Finch -  -65 kg
John Teine Glen
Wilfred Kurua
Albert Scott
Jack Viyufa -  -75 kg,  All Categories
Lucas Wemin

Boxing

Papua New Guinea has qualified 8 athletes.

Men
Jack Willie -  -49 kg
Kanku Raka Junior -  -52 kg
Andrew Opugu -  -56 kg
Tom Boga -  -60 kg
Noel Eko Aisa -  -64 kg
Moses Ririan Jr
Peter Michael
Tony Toliman -  -81 kg

Canoeing

Papua New Guinea has qualified 12 athletes.

Men
Genomou Geno
Frank Kevau
Gabe Rei
Vai Reva
Kila Willie
Ronnie Hae
Kea Morea
Victor Charlie
Samuel Frank
Kila Max Mala
Gabe Morea
Heni Naime

Cricket

Papua New Guinea has qualified a team. Each team can consist of a maximum of 15 athletes.

Men -  Team Tournament
Jack Vare
Joel Tom 
Assad Vala 
Tony Ura 
John Boge Reva
Vani Vagi Morea
Kapena Arua
Pipi Raho
Inoa Baeau
Jason Kila
Jacob Mado
Mahuta Kivung
Heni Siaka
Vali Albert

Football

Papua New Guinea has qualified a men's and women's team. Each team can consist of a maximum of 21 athletes.

Men
Lesly Kalai
Tonga Esira
Valentine Nelson
Cyril Muta
Kelly Jampu
Samuel Kini
Gari Moka
Michael Foster
Alex Davani
Reginald Devani
Nathaniel Lepani
David Muta
Andrew Lepani
Niel Hans
Jamal Seeto
Jeremy Yasasa
Mauri Wasi
Eric Komeng
Koriak Upaiga
David Aua
Felix Bondaluke
Ian Yanum
Ronold Warisan

Women -  Team Tournament
Fidelma Watpore
Frances Mandoni
Linah Honeakii
Agai Max
Ruth Turia
Helen Lebong
Kathrina Salaiau
Janie Nori
Cecilia Dobbin
Esther Kurabi
Docas Sesevo
Jaqlyne Chalau
Deslyne Siniu
Defney Francis
Barbra Muta
Sandra Birum
Pauline Turakaur
Alexia Stephen
Ramona Morris
Miriam Lanta
Ara Midi
Miriam Louma
Linda Bunaga

Golf

Papua New Guinea has qualified 8 athletes.

Men
Sammy Bob
Soti Dinki
Norman Gabriel
Robin James

Women
Margaret Lavaki
Shavina Bakiu Maras
Darrie Nightingale
Rosalind Taufa

Judo

Papua New Guinea has qualified 10 athletes.

Men
Raymond Ovinou
Andrew David
Kila Arusa
Donald Karo
Ashaan Nelson
Numa Keneke
Liva John

Women
Martina Vui
Marie Keneke
Kacey Keneke

Karate

Papua New Guinea has qualified 13 athletes.

Men
Sailas Piskaut
David Wallace
Manu Mekere
Rickinson Mekere
Julius Piku -  -60 kg
Nigel Bana
Emil Golupau
Suwari Matus
Gesa Misak
Dominic Sipapi

Women
Melissa Turia -  -50 kg
Doris Karomo
Jacklyn Barney -  -61 kg,  Open

Powerlifting

Papua New Guinea has qualified 12 athletes.

Men
Kalau Andrew -  -59 kg
Kelly Hendry -  -59 kg
Idau Asigau Michael
Masalai Wan -  -66 kg
Brown Bolong
Kenny Naime -  -74 kg
Livingstone Sikoli -  -83 kg

Women
Mary Peto -  -52 kg
Hitolo Kevau -  -57 kg
Melissa Tikio -  -63 kg
Linda Pulsan -  -72 kg
Meteng Wak -  -84 kg

Rugby sevens

Papua New Guinea has qualified a men's and women's team. Each team can consist of a maximum of 12 athletes.

Men -  Team Tournament
Montgomery Diave
Smith Lakas
Billy Torea
Douglas Guise
Christopher Kakah
Eugene Tokavai
Henry Liliket
Roland Namo
Tisa Kautu
Albert Levi
Jason Missian
Gairo Varo

Women -  Team Tournament
Debbie Kaore
Ana-Patricia Torea
Jemimah Meraudje
Lynette Kwarula
Kymlie Rapilla
Joanna Logana
Margaret Naua
Dulcie Bomai
Cassandra Samson
Geua Larry
Catherine Rhambu
Talesanga Bagita

Sailing

Papua New Guinea has qualified 8 athletes.

John Numa
Leonard Isaiah
Janet Va'a
Rose Lee Numa
Navu Gerea Buggsy Charlie
John David
James Leblanc
Boisen Numa

Squash

 	
Papua New Guinea has qualified 10 athletes.

Men
Lokes Brooksbank
Schubert Maketu
Suari Madako Jr
Kerry Walsh
Robin Morove

Women
Lynette Vai
Sheila Rhonda Morove
Imong Brooksbank
Tina Yansom
Merlyn Alarcos

Surfing

 	
Papua New Guinea has qualified 3 athletes.

Men
Titima Mange

Women
Elizaberth Nakos
Marianne Longa

Swimming

Papua New Guinea has qualified 11 athletes.

Men
Adam Ampa'oi
Nathan Ampa'oi -  4x100 Medley Relay
Stanford Kawale
Ian Bond Wolongkatop Nakmai -  4 × 100 m Medley Relay
Ryan Pini -  200m Freestyle,  50m Backstroke,  100m Backstroke,  50m Butterfly,  100m Butterfly,  50m Freestyle,  100m Freestyle,  4 × 100 m Medley Relay
Peter Popahun Pokawin -  4 × 100 m Medley Relay
Nathan Tukana

Women
Tegan McCarthy -  4 × 100 m Freestyle Relay,  4 × 200 m Freestyle Relay,  4 × 100 m Medley Relay
Judith Meauri -  4 × 100 m Freestyle Relay,  4 × 200 m Freestyle Relay,  4x100 Medley Relay
Anna Liza Mopio -  50m Freestyle,  200m Freestyle,  50m Backstroke,  100m Backstroke,  100m Freestyle,  200m Backstroke,  50m Butterfly,  4 × 100 m Freestyle Relay,  4 × 200 m Freestyle Relay,  4 × 100 m Medley Relay
Barbara Vali -  4 × 100 m Freestyle Relay,  4 × 200 m Freestyle Relay,  4x100 Medley Relay

Table tennis

Papua New Guinea has qualified 6 athletes.

Men
Jackson Morea Kariko
David Rea Loi
Jack Varia
Willie Sibona

Women
Samantha Rea Loi
Maryanne Rea Loi

Taekwondo

Papua New Guinea has qualified 18 athletes.

Men
Albert Bexton Karulaka -  -54 kg
Anton Aitisi -  -63 kg
Ivan Kassman
Henry Ori
Hemmison Essau -  -68 kg
Chatterton Roberts -  -80 kg
Alfred Daera -  Team Tournament
John Doura -  Team Tournament
Colland Kokin -  Team Tournament
Reina Peni -  Team Tournament

Women
Bonnie Nohokau -  -53 kg
Noelyne Hetana -  -62 kg
Theresa Tona -  -49 kg
Trinette Soatsin -  -57 kg
Rittah Elisabeth Toliman -  -67 kg
Stephnie Kombo -  Team Tournament
Gimale Oli -  Team Tournament
Theresa Tona -  Team Tournament

Tennis

 	
Papua New Guinea has qualified 6 athletes.

Men
Lochlan Kitchen
Mark Gibbons
Michael Fo'o

Women
Marcia Tere Apisah -  Double Tournament,  Team Tournament
Abigail Tere-Apisah -  Double Tournament,  Team Tournament,  Single Tournament
Lorish Puluspene -  Team Tournament

Triathlon

Papua New Guinea has qualified 4 athletes.

Men
Mairi Feeger
Leka Kila
Polihau Popeliau

Women
Rachael James

Volleyball

Beach Volleyball

Papua New Guinea has qualified a men's and women's team. Each team can consist of a maximum of 2 members.

Men
Manly Kapa
Moha Mea

Women
Raka Tai
Dianne Moia

Indoor Volleyball

Papua New Guinea has qualified a men's and women's team. Each team can consist of a maximum of 12 members.

Men -  Team Tournament
Richard Kila Rupa
Loi Walo
Ula Gima
Gia Kapa
Veupu Kila
Kala Kila
Ravuiwa Mahuru Rau
George David
Micky Forova Arifeae
Jeffery Charlie
Gereana Kila
Tuksy Maino

Women
Annrika Garena
Jossie Dick
Veuga Sinari
Isa Hicks
Alison Aki Eka
Madia Hairai
Aileen Gima
Lois Garena
Manu Kapu Kila
Philo Ameisa
Clear Vele
Delphine Opu

Weightlifting

Papua New Guinea has qualified 8 athletes.

Men
Morea Baru -  -56 kg Clean & Jerk,  -56 kg Total,  -56 kg Snatch
Oala Fred Karoho
Toua Udia -  -69 kg Clean & Jerk,  -69 kg Snatch,  -69 kg Total
Grox Soho

Women
Kathleen Hare -  -48 kg Clean & Jerk,  -48 kg Total,  -48 kg Snatch
Loa Dika Toua -  -53 kg Clean & Jerk,  -53 kg Snatch,  -53 kg Total
Monalisa Kassman -  -58 kg Clean & Jerk,  -58 kg Snatch,  -58 kg Total
Rita Kari -  -63 kg Clean & Jerk,  -63 kg Snatch,  -63 kg Total

References

2011 in Papua New Guinean sport
Nations at the 2011 Pacific Games
Papua New Guinea at the Pacific Games